Lantern Publishing & Media is an American non-profit book publisher founded in 2020, having acquired the assets of Booklight Inc. DBA Lantern Books in 2019. Booklight was founded in 1999, and first located in Union Square (New York City), before moving to Brooklyn in 2007, where Lantern Publishing & Media now has its offices. The subject areas that Lantern Publishing & Media covers include veganism, animal rights, humane education, spirituality, wellness and recovery, and social justice. Lantern distributes books published by the American Mental Health Foundation, and is in turn distributed by Red Wheel Weiser.

Notable authors
Carol J. Adams, feminist and animal rights activist
Brooks Brown, survivor of the Columbine High School massacre and author of No Easy Answers: The Truth Behind Death at Columbine High School
Jo-Anne McArthur, award-winning photojournalist and founder of We Animals Media
Ingrid Newkirk, founding president of People for the Ethical Treatment of Animals (PETA)
Thomas Keating, American Roman Catholic monk, and co-founder of Contemplative Outreach
A. Breeze Harper, editor of Sistah Vegan: Black Women Speak on Food, Identity, Health, and Society (10th Anniversary Edition)
Patricia Wright, primatologist and conservationist
Eric Adams (politician), Brooklyn borough president and contributor to Brotha Vegan: Black Men Speak on Food, Identity, Health, and Society
Basheer Ahmad Masri, Indian Islamic scholar and animal welfare writer

Selected books
Adewale, Omowale, editor. Brotha Vegan: Black Men Speak on Food, Identity, Health, and Society, 2021. 
Best, Steven; Nocella, Anthony J. Terrorists or Freedom Fighters? Reflections on the Liberation of Animals, 2004. 
Brown, Brooks; Merritt, Rob. No Easy Answers: The Truth Behind Death at Columbine, 2002. 
Keating, Thomas. Divine Therapy and Addiction, 2011. 
Ko, Aph; Ko, Syl. Aphro-Ism: Essays on Pop Culture, Feminism, and Black Veganism from Two Sisters, 2017.  
McArthur, Jo-Anne. We Animals (paperback edition), 2017. 
Pozatek, Krissy. The Parallel Process: Growing Alongside Your Adolescent or Young Adult Child in Treatment, 2010. 
Tuttle, Will. The World Peace Diet: Tenth Anniversary Edition, 2016. 
Wright, Patricia. For the Love of Lemurs (paperback edition), 2016.

References

External links
 Lantern Publishing & Media Lantern Publishing & Media's official website.
 Lantern Media Lantern's internet division.

Publishing companies established in 2020
Book publishing companies based in New York (state)
2020 establishments in New York (state)